Pacolet Mills Historic District is a national historic district located at Pacolet, Spartanburg County, South Carolina. It encompasses 126 contributing buildings and 1 contributing site in the mill village of Pacolet.  Pacolet Mills village that was laid out and built in 1919, with most worker and supervisor houses were built between 1915 and 1920.  Also located in the district are the Pacolet Mills Cloth Room and Warehouse, Pacolet Mill Office, and two churches.  The three main Pacolet Mills (1883, 1888, and 1891) and a fourth mill (1894) were demolished in the late 1980s.

It was listed on the National Register of Historic Places in 2007.

References

External links
Pacolet Mills community website

Historic districts on the National Register of Historic Places in South Carolina
Buildings and structures in Spartanburg County, South Carolina
National Register of Historic Places in Spartanburg County, South Carolina